Lawrence Alan Shepp (September 9, 1936 Brooklyn, NY – April 23, 2013, Tucson, AZ) was an American mathematician, specializing in statistics and computational tomography.

Shepp obtained his PhD from Princeton University in 1961 with a dissertation entitled Recurrent Sums of Random Variables.  His advisor was William Feller.  He joined Bell Laboratories in 1962. He joined Rutgers University in 1997.  He joined University of Pennsylvania in 2010.

His work in tomography has had biomedical imaging applications, and he has also worked as professor of radiology at Columbia University (1973–1996), as a mathematician in the radiology service of Columbia Presbyterian Hospital.

Awards and honors
 2014: IEEE Marie Sklodowska-Curie Award
 2012: Became a fellow of the American Mathematical Society.
 1992: Elected member of the Institute of Medicine
 1989: Elected member of the National Academy of Sciences
 1979: IEEE Distinguished Scientist Award in 1979
 1979: Lester R. Ford Award (with Joseph Kruskal)

See also
Fishburn–Shepp inequality
Shepp–Logan phantom
Shepp–Olkin conjecture
Coupon collector's problem
Discrete tomography
Dubins path
Gaussian process
Hook length formula
Parallel parking problem
Sieve estimator
Ridge function

References

External links

 
 Obituary at Penn

Princeton University alumni
Rutgers University faculty
University of Pennsylvania faculty
20th-century American mathematicians
21st-century American mathematicians
American statisticians
Probability theorists
Members of the United States National Academy of Sciences
Fellows of the American Mathematical Society
1936 births
2013 deaths
Members of the National Academy of Medicine